The 1974 Tokyo WCT, also known by its sponsored name Kawasaki Tennis Classic, was a men's tennis tournament played on outdoor hard courts at the National Tennis Stadium in Tokyo, Japan. The event was part of the Green Group of the 1974 World Championship Tennis circuit. It was the second edition of the tournament and was held from 8 April through 14 April 1974. Rod Laver won the singles title and the accompanying $10,000 first prize money.

Finals

Singles
 Rod Laver defeated  Juan Gisbert 5–7, 6–2, 6–0

Doubles
 Raymond Moore /  Onny Parun defeated  Juan Gisbert /  Roger Taylor 4–6, 6–2, 6–4

References

External links
 ITF tournament edition details

Tokyo WCT
Tokyo WCT
Tokyo WCT
Tokyo WCT
Tennis tournaments in Japan